Argay is a neighborhood in the Northeast section of Portland, Oregon. Argay is bounded by the Columbia River on the north, NE 122nd Ave on the west, Interstate 84 on the south, and NE 148th Ave. on the east. 
Originally conceived of by Art Simonson and Gerhardt (Gay) Stavney (the “Ar” and “Gay” of Argay) as a "move-up" suburban family neighborhood alternative to Portland's congested inner-city, Argay Terrace built out as planned with larger homes on large lots spread out over the gently sloping terrain that gave the area an open feeling. Homes are typical of the style called "Mid-Century Modern" with a mix of one-story ranches (most with basements or daylight basements), split-entry, split-level, and some modern two-story colonials.

References

External links
Mid-county Memo (local newspaper)
Argay Street Tree Inventory Report

Neighborhoods in Portland, Oregon
Oregon populated places on the Columbia River